The XI Corps of the Indian Army is based in Jalandhar and is a part of Western Command.

History
XI Corps was raised to take command of the formations in the Punjab in 1950 as India reorganised its post-1947 army to meet the new threat of Pakistan. It was raised on March 1, 1950 at Ambala under the command of Lieutenant General Kalwant Singh. The corps headquarters was relocated to Jalandhar in July 1951.

To reduce the load of XI Corps, X Corps was formed at Bathinda on 1 July 1979, taking over south Punjab and north Rajasthan.

Formation Sign
The Corps formation sign consists of the 'red-white-red background' depicting a corps of the Indian Army overlaid by a Vajra, the powerful thunderbolt weapon of Lord Indra, the symbol of sacrifice of the great sage Dadhichi, who voluntarily sacrificed his body to make the fiercest weapon from his thighbone.

Organisation

The corps consists of:

7 Infantry Division (Golden Arrow Division) headquartered at Firozpur, raised in 1964.
9 Infantry Division (Pine Division) headquartered at Meerut. It has one brigade each at Meerut, Delhi and Jalandhar.
15 Infantry Division (Panther Division) headquartered at Amritsar. Appears to include 350 Infantry Brigade.
23 (Independent) Armoured Brigade (Flaming Arrow Brigade) at Khasa, Amritsar.
55 (Independent) Mechanised Brigade (Double Victory Brigade) at Beas
Corps Artillery Brigade
Corps Air Defence Brigade

Operations
Indo-Pakistani War of 1965
Indo-Pakistani War of 1971

List of Commanders

Notes

References 

011
Military units and formations of the British Empire in World War II
Military units and formations established in 1950